The Zanclean is the lowest stage or earliest age on the geologic time scale of the Pliocene. It spans the time between 5.332 ± 0.005 Ma (million years ago) and 3.6 ± 0.005 Ma. It is preceded by the Messinian Age of the Miocene Epoch, and followed by the Piacenzian Age.

The Zanclean can be correlated with regionally used stages, such as the Opoitian of New Zealand, and the Tabianian or Dacian of Central Europe. It also corresponds to the late Hemphillian to mid-Blancan North American Land Mammal Ages. In California, the Zanclean roughly corresponds to the middle part of the Delmontian stage.

Definition
The Zanclean Stage was introduced by Giuseppe Seguenza in 1868. It is named after Zancle, the pre-Roman name for the Italian city of Messina on Sicily.

The base of the Zanclean (and the Pliocene Series) lies with the top of magnetic chronozone Cr3 (about 100,000 years before the Thvera normal subchronozone C3n.4n). The base is also close to the extinction level of the calcareous nanoplankton species Triquetrorhabdulus rugosus (the base of biozone CN10b) and the first appearance of nanoplankton Ceratolithus acutus. The GSSP for the Zanclean is in the vicinity of the ruins of the ancient city of Heraclea Minoa on Sicily, Italy.

The top of the Zanclean Stage (the base of the Piacenzian Stage) is at the base of magnetic chronozone C2An (the base of the Gauss chronozone and at the extinction of the planktonic forams Globorotalia margaritae and Pulleniatina primalis.

Events of the Zanclean  
 The Zanclean flood marked the beginning of the age and the end of the Messinian, as water poured in from the Atlantic Ocean through the Strait of Gibraltar to deluge the Mediterranean Basin and end the Messinian Event, a period about 5.96 Ma ago in the Messinian Age of the Miocene Epoch when the Mediterranean Sea had evaporated partly or completely.
Deposits in the Everglades were deposited when high tropical water started to return in the late Zanclean.

References

Notes

Literature

; 1998: The Global Standard Stratotype section and Point (GSSP) of the Piacenzian Stage (Middle Pliocene), Episodes, 21(2): pp 88–93.
 (eds.) (2005) A Geologic Time Scale 2004 Cambridge University Press, Cambridge, UK, .
; 1868: La Formation Zancléenne, ou recherches sur une nouvelle formation tertiaire, Bulletin de la Société Géologique de France, séries 2, 25: 465-485. 
; 2000: The base of the Zanclean Stage and of the Pliocene Series, Episodes, 23(3): pp 179–187.

External links
 
Neogene timescale, at the website of the subcommission for stratigraphic information of the ICS
 Neogene timescale at the website of the Norwegian network of offshore records of geology and stratigraphy

 
01
Neogene geochronology
Geological ages